Mpoeleng Mpoeleng is a Botswana footballer who has four caps for the Botswana national football team.

References
 

Living people
Botswana footballers
Botswana international footballers
Mochudi Centre Chiefs SC players
Association football defenders
1980 births